Duane Dudley Chase (born December 12, 1950) is an American software engineer and former actor best remembered as Kurt von Trapp in The Sound of Music (1965). He also had a small role in the family film Follow Me, Boys! (1966) and played Danny Matthews in The Big Valley for one episode.

In the summer of 1969, Chase joined the United States Forest Service in Santa Barbara, California, after graduating from Rolling Hills High School of Rolling Hills, California. Chase then enrolled at the University of California, Santa Barbara and graduated in 1976 with a B.S. in geology. After working at a Chevron refinery in Denver for a year, he then enrolled at the University of Alabama and earned a master's degree in geology.

He lives in Washington and is returning to wildlife and forestry work. He is married to Petra Maria, who was born in Hamburg, Germany, a registered nurse.

References

External links

1950 births
Living people
American male film actors
American male child actors
Male actors from Seattle
American software engineers
University of Alabama alumni
University of California, Santa Barbara alumni
Engineers from California
United States Department of Agriculture people